The Museum of the Sea was a museum of marine biology and aquarium in the seaside city of Mar del Plata, Argentina. The museum closed its doors in September 2012, after 12 years in operation.

Overview 
A gift box containing 15 seashells, and delivered to 18-year-old Benjamín Sisterna from his brother in 1932, created a lifelong fascination with sea shells and oceanography in the young man. Twenty-six trips around the world in sixty years resulted in a personal collection of over 30,000 shells, fossils and marine invertebrates, among other items.

Sisterna's death in 1995 left the collection to his heirs, who began work on the Museo del Mar, The Museum of the Sea, in Mar del Plata. Born in Santa Fe, Argentina, a city far from the Atlantic Ocean, Sisterna had lived in seaside mar del Plata for the last 40 years of his life.

Inaugurated on September 22, 2000, the museum was divided into four levels:

 The ground floor included the lobby, which featured a map of the world tracing Sisterna's exploratory travels. The gift shop, Benjamin Sisterna Auditorium and the Gloria Maris Café (named after the hill on which the museum was built) lead from the lobby, and were surrounded by aquaria and glass cabinets.
 A lower level housed geological displays, and was laid out in a hall reproducing a submerged cave. The cave featured a central pond inhabited by smaller marine organisms, and is connected with the ground-floor aquaria.
 The second floor was divided into two areas, including one exhibiting contemporary art and cultural objects, and the nacre and seashell collection hall, where exhibits were displayed and labeled in glass cabinets.
 The third floor featured a photographic gallery of Sisterna's travels and of oceanography generally, as well as a vantage point towards the lower the floors designed to visually integrate the aforementioned displays. The hall lead to a children's activities section, a meteorological station and an observation deck, which provided an expansive view of the city and ocean beyond.
The museum closed its doors in 2012 due to the lack of official funds to continue its activities. The multinational technological company Globant acquired the building in 2014. One of its founders is Guibert Englebienne Jr, an entrepreneur born in Mar del Plata and whose family has deep roots in the city.

References

External links 

Museo del Mar 

Tourist attractions in Mar del Plata
Aquaria in Argentina
Defunct aquaria
Museums in Buenos Aires Province
Defunct museums
Museums established in 2000
Buildings and structures in Mar del Plata
Natural history museums in Argentina
Articles needing infobox zoo
Museums disestablished in 2012